United States gubernatorial elections were held on November 5, 2013 in New Jersey and Virginia. These elections formed part of the 2013 United States elections. Before the elections, both seats were held by Republicans. Republican incumbent Chris Christie won reelection in New Jersey, while in Virginia, Democrat Terry McAuliffe won the open seat held by term-limited Republican Bob McDonnell.

Race summary

Results

Closest races 
States where the margin of victory was under 5%:
 Virginia, 2.6%

Blue denotes states won by Democrats.

New Jersey 

Governor Chris Christie ran for a second term. Christie's re-election campaign could be the prelude to a 2016 presidential campaign for him.

Christie's approval ratings have hovered at or above 50% consistently throughout 2012, and broke records as the highest approval rating of any New Jersey governor in a recent Fairleigh Dickinson poll.

State Senator and former State Senate Democratic Leader Barbara Buono was the Democratic nominee.

The Libertarian nominee was Ken Kaplan, who also ran for U.S. Senator in 2012.

Chris Christie cruised to victory on November 5, 2013 when he won in a landslide victory against his adversary, Barbara Buono. Christie won 60.4% of the vote compared to 38.1% of the vote Buono earned. Exit polls also showed that Christie appealed to ethnic minorities, an increasing priority for Republicans.

Virginia 

Governor Bob McDonnell was term-limited in 2013, as Governors of Virginia cannot serve consecutive terms.

Attorney General Ken Cuccinelli was the Republican nominee for Governor, after winning the nomination at Virginia's 2013 Republican Party convention.

Terry McAuliffe, former chairman of the Democratic National Committee, was the Democratic nominee for Governor, after being the only candidate to file for the race.

Robert Sarvis, an entrepreneur and lawyer, was the Libertarian Party nominee. On June 26, 2013, the Virginia State Board of Elections confirmed to Sarvis's campaign that he would be listed on the ballot statewide during the elections this November.

On November 5, 2013, Terry McAuliffe narrowly beat Ken Cuccinelli by a margin of 48% to 45.5% with Robert Sarvis accounting for the other 6.6% of the vote.

References